The Attack on Camp Massart took place on 16 December 1961 and was an attack on Camp Massart, the heavily defended main base of the Katangese Gendarmerie during the Congo Crisis. The attack was part of Operation Unokat which aimed to break the roadblocks set up by the gendarmerie by the end of November 1961 and at the same time stop Katangese President Moïse Tshombe's opposition to the UN. In a coordinated offensive, Swedish troops captured Camp Massart; Irish troops attacked the railway tunnel; the Indian contingent created diversionary attacks and blocked fleeing Katangese forces; and the Ethiopian forces secured the western part of the city. The attack on Camp Massart begun in the early hours of 16 December and ended at around 1 pm when the Swedes captured the camp. Between 10 and 20 Gendarmes were killed in the attack. One Swedish soldier was killed and five were injured.

The attack
The 1st Brigade, which was under the command of Colonel Jonas Wærn, consisted of the Swedish and the Irish battalion. The Swedish battalion, led by Major Ulf Mide, included two platoons of the 3rd Company from the old 12th Battalion under Major Robert Ekengren of Dalarna Regiment. One platoon from the old 1st Company was in the operation under Ekengren's command. It also included two companies of the newly arrived 14th Battalion. One anti-aircraft squad with 20 mm AA automatic guns had been added.

The battalion's goal was to capture the gendarmerie main base, Camp Massart. At 03.00 am, the battalion went into attack position. The 3rd Company's platoon Gullstrand constituted the advance party. At 03.40 am, nine (Indian, Irish and Swedish) mortars started firing which lasted for 35 minutes. 940 grenades were fired and of these grenades, 168 were fired in rafale for 10 minutes. The advance began and an extraordinarily strong tropical downpour filled in a few minutes the Kapemba stream which became a rushing river. The advance party got with difficulty wading across; a machine-gun squad moved the heavy Kulspruta m/42 machine gun across using a floating door. The rest of the company had to look toward the only bridge that existed. The new 1st Company that went to the left got over with the help of a rope. The new 2nd Company, which went to the right, managed to find a small boat. The attack was delayed. The advance took place under heavy enemy fire from mortars and machine guns, and from snipers in the buildings' upper floors. Some houses got cleaned out using armor piercing explosive shells, fired by Carl Gustaf 8.4cm recoilless rifle gunner Andersson from Skövde. The recoilless rifle gunner in the platoon Kamstedt, Lars Frost, excelled during the operation. Sub-machine guns and hand grenades were suitable close-quarters combat weapons for urban warfare.

The Swedes were unable to use their vehicles which were stuck in the mud. Instead, they stormed the bridge, which was under fire from Camp Massart. By 08.30 the distance was close enough, 30 meters from the Camp Massart's main entrance, which was partially blocked, for the Swedes to make a charge. The advance party (Gullstrand) secured the flanks with two machine guns and 3rd Company's 2nd Platoon (Kamstedt) stormed into the big military base. The Swedes stormed straight for the main entrance, which they captured after a fierce hand-to-hand fighting. The Gendarmes now regrouped and at 09.30 they went into a violent counter-attack. The attack was directed against the Swedes' left flank and was supported by fire from the surrounding houses inhabited by European employees of the Katangan railway company BCK. The Gendarmes attacked with rage and the Swedes again entered into hand-to-hand fighting. At 1 pm, the UN headquarters announced that the Swedes had definitely captured the area around the main entrance but that it would take the whole day would to clear the rest of Camp Massart. A few hours later, however, it was announced that Camp Massart had fallen and that the Swedes had complete control over the Katangese stronghold.

Aftermath
Two days of lighter battles followed with the clearing of other resistance strongholds in the city. On 18 December Secretary-General U Thant declared a unilateral ‘temporary ceasefire’ and Tshombe began to negotiate with the central government. During the December fightings, three Swedes were killed, while 13 were wounded. A moderate figure in accordance with professional analysts, given the opponent's firepower. During the attack on Camp Massart, one Swedish soldier was killed, private Lars Erik Öhrberg, and a few were wounded. In total during the December fighting, 21 UN troops were killed and 84 wounded. Among the Katangans, 206 Gendarmes were killed and an unknown number wounded. The 12th Swedish Battalion was demobilized and flown back to Sweden where the Army Command received them.

Footnotes

References

Further reading

Congo Crisis
Massart
Massart
Massart
Mercenary warfare
1960s in the Democratic Republic of the Congo
United Nations operations in the Democratic Republic of the Congo
History of Katanga